"You Better Dance" is a song by the American sibling group, The Jets. The song was released as the first single from their third album, Believe, in 1989.

On the Billboard Hot 100, the song charted at number 59. It reached number 73 on the R&B chart and had further success on the dance chart, peaking at number 28.

Chart performance

References

External links

Songs written by Michael Jonzun
1989 songs
MCA Records singles
Dance-pop songs